Nathan Cunningham (born September 30, 1981) is a Canadian bobsledder.

Born  in Calgary, Alberta, Cunningham began competing in bobsleigh in 2002, and joined the national team in 2003. His top finish on the World Cup circuit came in a two-man event in Innsbruck, when he teamed with driver Serge Despres to finish 12th.

Cunningham also competed at the 2006 Olympics in Turin. He was part of the Canada-2 crew in the Four-man event, along with Serge Despres, Steve Larsen and David Bissett. The team ended up in 18th place.

References

External links
 

1981 births
Bobsledders at the 2006 Winter Olympics
Canadian male bobsledders
Living people
Olympic bobsledders of Canada
Sportspeople from Calgary